John O'Shea (born 24 July 1975) is a professional Irish darts player, who plays in the Professional Darts Corporation events. His most notable achievement is winning the 2019 World Masters, the first Irish player to win a major global tournament in many years.

Career
O' Shea had his biggest career win to date at the controversial 2019 World Masters, one of three Irish players winning titles at the tournament. Unseeded in the draw, he defeated Neil Duff, Mario Vandenbogaerde and Scott Waites in the final stages. In doing so, he became the first Irish player in the modern era to win a major tournament.

In October 2019, he qualified for the 2020 BDO World Darts Championship after his win at the 2019 World Masters. He lost 3–2 to Andreas Harrysson in the preliminary round.

World Championship results

BDO
 2020: Preliminary round (lost to Andreas Harrysson 2–3)

PDC
 2023: First round (lost to Darius Labanauskas 2–3)

Performance timeline 

PDC European Tour

References

External links
 
 
 

Living people
Irish darts players
1975 births
Professional Darts Corporation current tour card holders